Konstantin Yuryevich Volkov (born 28 February 1960 in Irkutsk) is a retired pole vaulter.

Biography
He represented the USSR. In 1980 he won the European Indoor Championships with a championship record of 5.60 metres (which was beaten the following year). He also won an Olympic silver medal at the 1980 Summer Olympics in Moscow. In 1983 he won a silver medal at the inaugural World Championships in 1983, and the next year he jumped 5.85 metres, his personal best.

External links 

1960 births
Living people
Sportspeople from Irkutsk
Russian male pole vaulters
Soviet male pole vaulters
Olympic athletes of the Soviet Union
Olympic silver medalists for the Soviet Union
Athletes (track and field) at the 1980 Summer Olympics
World Athletics Championships medalists
Medalists at the 1980 Summer Olympics
Olympic silver medalists in athletics (track and field)
Universiade medalists in athletics (track and field)
Universiade gold medalists for the Soviet Union
Medalists at the 1981 Summer Universiade
Medalists at the 1983 Summer Universiade
Friendship Games medalists in athletics